The 2018 Coupe du Congo is the 34th edition of the Coupe du Congo, the knockout football competition of the Republic of the Congo.

Round 1
[May 25]

FC Emmanuel                   5-0 Ajax de Ouenzé

Lion Poto Poto                awd AS Nsiemba                    [awarded 0-3]

[May 26]

AS Penarol                    5-2 FC Flamengo

Mbila Sport                   4-1 Etoile Talas

CFF Futur Champion            1-3 BNG

CMBF                          awd Aigle Sport                   [awarded 3-0]

US Bantou                     0-1 Interclub Pointe-Noire

[May 27]

FC Racine                     awd Real Impact                   [awarded 3-0]  

Olympic Club Brazzaville      awd TP Mystère                    [awarded 3-0]

EF Total                      0-0 ASK Pointe-Noire              [5-4 pen]

FC Tchimani                   awd Pigeon Vert                   [awarded 3-0]

Lion Blessé                   0-2 Jeunes Fauves

Asia Sport                    0-1 Interclub Dolisie            

JS Mouyondzi                  1-2 FC Corneil

FC Mboukoudou                 awd FC Mouyengué                  [awarded 3-0]

Patronage Sibiti              awd Carpillon Sibiti              [awarded 3-0]      

CO Harleme                    1-0 AS Kimbonguela

FC Ignié                      0-0 AS Elbo                       [3-4 pen]

ATP                           awd Etoile Djambala               [awarded 3-0]    

Patronage Djambala            awd CARA Djambala                 [awarded 0-3]

Caiman Mossaka                n/p Etoile Mossaka                [both teams forfeited] 

AS Oka                        2-3 Ayandza Sport

St.-Michel Ouesso             drw CARA Ouesso                   [5-4 pen]

Diables Noirs Ouesso          0-7 FC Biala

Etoile Impfondo               awd Etoile Ouesso                 [awarded 3-0]

[May 28]

Racine Club Olympique         1-3 RCB

Red Star                      0-2 Yaba Sport    

FC Nathalys                   0-0 TP Mokanda                    [14-13 pen]

[May 29]

US Djeno                       -  Fleur du Ciel                 [apparently not played]

TP Caiman                      -  FC Pélérin                    [apparently not played]

[May 30]

CRCI                           -  Club des Jeunes               [apparently not played]

AS Vaudou                     n/p Munisport                     [both clubs to next round]

Round 2
[Jun 9]

Tongo FC                      1-2 BNG

FC Racine                     0-2 Etoile du Congo

Munisport                     1-1 AS Cheminots                  [1-3 pen]

FC Tchimani                   0-6 La Mancha

[Jun 10]

Ayandza Sport                 1-3 CARA Brazzaville

AS Elbo                       0-4 Diables Noirs

AS Vaudou                     1-0 Nico-Nicoye

Interclub Pointe-Noire        1-0 AS Vita Club Mokanda

Jeunes Fauves                 1-2 Interclub Brazzaville

AC Léopards                   2-0 Interclub Dolisie

FC Corneil                    3-1 JS Poto Poto

FC Biala                      0-0 JS Talangai                   [0-3 pen]

St.-Michel Ouesso             1-7 AS Otôho

Yaba Sport                    1-1 St.-Michel de Ouenzé          [1-3 pen] 

CARA Djambala                 awd Patronage Ste.-Anne           [awarded 3-0]

[Jun 11]

RCB                           3-2 FC Kondzo

Round 3
[Jun 23]

St.-Michel de Ouenzé          0-1 Interclub Brazzaville 

Etoile du Congo               2-1 BNG

[Jun 24]

Diables Noirs                 5-0 RCB

AS Cheminots                  1-0 Interclub Pointe-Noire

La Mancha                     5-0 AS Vaudou

AC Léopards                   1-0 FC Corneil

AS Otôho                      4-1 CARA Djambala    

CARA Brazzaville              1-0 JS Talangai

Quarterfinals
First Legs [Jul 8]

AS Cheminots                  0-0 Diables Noirs

CARA Brazzaville              0-0 AC Léopards

AS Otôho                      3-1 Interclub Brazzaville

La Mancha                     2-1 Etoile du Congo
 
Second Legs

[Jul 12]

AC Léopards                   2-0 CARA Brazzaville

[Jul 14]

Interclub Brazzaville          0-3 AS Otôho                      

[Jul 15]

Etoile du Congo               2-2 La Mancha                     

Diables Noirs                 2-1 AS Cheminots

Semifinals
First Legs [Jul 26]

Diables Noirs                 1-0 AC Léopards                   

La Mancha                     4-2 AS Otôho                      

Second Legs [Aug 5]

AS Otôho                      awd La Mancha                     [awarded 3-0; abandoned at 2-0 on 26', La Mancha walked off after they had had two penalties awarded against them]

AC Léopards                   2-4 Diables Noirs

Final
[Aug 13, Brazzaville]                    

Diables Noirs                 0-0 AS Otôho                      [5-3 pen]

See also
2018 Ligue 1

References

Congo
Cup
Football competitions in the Republic of the Congo